Dicarbonylbis(cyclopentadienyl)titanium is the chemical compound with the formula (η5-C5H5)2Ti(CO)2, abbreviated Cp2Ti(CO)2.  This maroon-coloured, air-sensitive species is soluble in aliphatic and aromatic solvents.  It has been used for the deoxygenation of sulfoxides, reductive coupling of aromatic aldehydes and reduction of aldehydes.

Structure and synthesis
Cp2Ti(CO)2 is prepared by the reduction of titanocene dichloride with magnesium as a slurry in THT under an atmosphere of carbon monoxide.
(C5H5)2TiCl2 + Mg + 2 CO → (C5H5)2Ti(CO)2 + MgCl2
Both Cp2Ti(CO)2 and Cp2TiCl2 are tetrahedral as are related zirconium and hafnium compounds. Of historical interest, the complex was first prepared by the reduction of titanocene dichloride with sodium cyclopentadienyl under an atmosphere of carbon monoxide.

Its structure has been confirmed by X-ray crystallography.

References

Titanocenes
Organotitanium compounds
Carbonyl complexes
Cyclopentadienyl complexes
Titanium(II) compounds